Kahina Messaoudene (born July 15, 1992 in Béjaïa) is an Algerian volleyball player.

Club information
Current club :  ASW Bejaia

References
 

1992 births
Living people
Volleyball players from Béjaïa
Algerian women's volleyball players
Middle blockers
21st-century Algerian people